Johann Friedrich Karl von Ostein (6 July 1689 – 4 June 1763) was the Prince-Bishop of Worms, Archbishop of Mainz and Elector of Mainz.

Early life
He was born as the eldest son of Count Johann Franz Sebastian von Ostein (1652-1718) and his wife, Countess Anna Karolina Maria von Schönborn (1671-1746).

Biography
He was a relative of Lothar Franz von Schönborn, a prior Archbishop-Elector of Mainz. On 22 April 1743 he was selected as a compromise candidate for Archbishop. His rule was overshadowed by the War of the Austrian Succession, Seven Years' War and subsequent peace treaty. Having supported the losing side in the Seven Years' War, the cost of reparations bankrupted Mainz.

A new mansion, Osteiner Hof was built along the Diethmarkt, now Schillerplatz, as his principal residence. The town experienced at Osteins time big changes. The electoral palace was largely completed in 1752. In addition, the new buildings of St. Peter's and the Jesuit church were built, as well as the Bassenheimer Hof on Diethmarkt. Johann Friedrich Karl died on 4 June 1763 and was buried in Mainz Cathedral.

1689 births
1763 deaths
Archbishop-Electors of Mainz
Roman Catholic bishops of Worms